In geometry, the truncated order-8 triangular tiling is a semiregular tiling of the hyperbolic plane. There are two hexagons and one octagon on each vertex. It has Schläfli symbol of t{3,8}.

Uniform colors

Symmetry 
The dual of this tiling represents the fundamental domains of *443 symmetry. It only has one subgroup 443, replacing mirrors with gyration points.

This symmetry can be doubled to 832 symmetry by adding a bisecting mirror to the fundamental domain.

Related tilings 
From a Wythoff construction there are ten hyperbolic uniform tilings that can be based from the regular octagonal tiling. 

It can also be generated from the (4 3 3) hyperbolic tilings:

This hyperbolic tiling is topologically related as a part of sequence of uniform truncated polyhedra with vertex configurations (n.6.6), and [n,3] Coxeter group symmetry.

See also 

 Triangular tiling
 Order-3 octagonal tiling
 Order-8 triangular tiling
 Tilings of regular polygons
 List of uniform tilings

References

 John H. Conway, Heidi Burgiel, Chaim Goodman-Strass, The Symmetries of Things 2008,  (Chapter 19, The Hyperbolic Archimedean Tessellations)

External links 

 Hyperbolic and Spherical Tiling Gallery
 KaleidoTile 3: Educational software to create spherical, planar and hyperbolic tilings
 Hyperbolic Planar Tessellations, Don Hatch

Hyperbolic tilings
Isogonal tilings
Order-8 tilings
Semiregular tilings
Triangular tilings
Truncated tilings